Charles Thynne (c 1568–1652) was an English politician who sat in the House of Commons at various times between 1614 and 1629.

Thynne was the son of Sir John Thynne, of Longleat, Wiltshire and his second wife Dorothy Wroughton, daughter of Sir William Wroughton, of Broad Hinton. He matriculated at Broadgates Hall, Oxford on 19 April 1583, aged 15. He was of Cheddar, Somerset. In 1614, he was elected Member of Parliament for Lymington in the Addled Parliament. He was elected Member of Parliament for Westbury in 1628 and sat until 1629 when King Charles decided to rule without parliament for eleven years.

References

 

1568 births
1652 deaths
Chares
Alumni of Broadgates Hall, Oxford
English MPs 1614
English MPs 1628–1629